Lawrence A. Lamoreux was a member of the Wisconsin State Assembly.

Biography
Lamoreaux was born on August 14, 1899 in Ashland, Wisconsin. He died on December 26, 1968.

Career
Lamoreux was admitted to the Wisconsin bar in 1924. He was elected to the Assembly in 1928. Additionally, he was a member of the Ashland City Council and Chairman of the Republican Committee of Ashland County, Wisconsin.

References

External links

People from Ashland, Wisconsin
Wisconsin lawyers
Republican Party members of the Wisconsin State Assembly
Wisconsin city council members
1899 births
1968 deaths
20th-century American politicians
20th-century American lawyers